Sapahaqui or Sapa Jaqhi (Aymara) is a municipality in the Loayza Province in the La Paz Department in Bolivia. Its seat is Sapahaqui (Sapa Jaqhi).

See also 
 K'ark'ani
 Pichaqani
 Pukara
 Suka Sukani
 Wila Quta

References 

  Instituto Nacional de Estadistica de Bolivia  (INE)

Municipalities of La Paz Department (Bolivia)